Anastasios Lordos (born 17 December 1949) is a Cypriot sports shooter. He competed in the mixed trap event at the 1984 Summer Olympics.

References

1949 births
Living people
Cypriot male sport shooters
Olympic shooters of Cyprus
Shooters at the 1984 Summer Olympics
Place of birth missing (living people)